Daniel Luca Vettori  (born 27 January 1979) is a New Zealand cricket coach and former cricketer who played for the New Zealand national cricket team. He was the 200th player to win their Test cricket cap for New Zealand.

Vettori was the youngest male player to have represented New Zealand in Test cricket, making his debut in February 1997 at the age of 18. He captained New Zealand between 2007 and 2011 and is New Zealand's most-capped Test cricketer and One Day International cricketer, with 112 Test caps and 291 ODI caps. A bowling all-rounder, Vettori was the eighth player in Test cricket history to take 300 wickets and score 3,000 runs.

A slow left-arm orthodox spin bowler, Vettori was known for his accuracy, flight and guile rather than prodigious turn. Vettori announced his retirement from all forms of cricket following the 2015 Cricket World Cup. He has since coached in a variety of roles.

Career
Vettori was born in Auckland and brought up in Hamilton, attending Marian School and later St. Paul's Collegiate School. He was initially a medium-pace bowler, but slowly transitioned to bowl off spin deliveries. He made his senior debut for Northern Districts in 1996/97 and his international debut during England's 1997 tour of New Zealand at the age of 18, at the time the youngest man to play Test cricket for New Zealand. He took his first international five-wicket haul against Sri Lanka in March of the same year.

He was among a very small minority of international sports stars to wear prescription spectacles while playing sport, and only one of very few cricketers in the modern era to play Test cricket with spectacles.

Captaincy
Prior to becoming captain on a permanent basis in 2007, Vettori had captained New Zealand in ODI cricket on occasion. He captained New Zealand at the inaugural Twenty20 World Championship in South Africa and subsequently was appointed the team's captain in all formats.

Vettori's captaincy began with a losing Test series in England and attracted some criticism during the ODI series which followed. He had shouted from the balcony at The Oval following a controversial run out and later refused to shake hands with the England team after the match. This approach contrasted with Fleming's more languid, laid back style.

Vettori stood down from the captaincy and retired from One day International and Twenty20 International cricket after the 2011 World Cup. He was recalled into the ODI team for the 2013 ICC Champions Trophy and the 2015 Cricket World Cup, by which time he had retired from Test cricket, his final Test match was as an emergency injury replacement against Pakistan in November 2014.

Bowling records

Vettori took his 300th Test wicket on New Zealand's tour of Sri Lanka in 2009, becoming only the second New Zealander to do so, joining Richard Hadlee. As of August 2022 his 362 Test wickets lies second only to  Hadlee and he is New Zealand's leading One Day International wicket-taker with 297 dismissals for the national side.

Vettori was the first left-arm spin bowler to take more than 300 wickets in both Test matches and One Day Internationals.
He was the youngest man to take 100 Test wickets, doing so by the age of 21. In 2005, 2008 and 2010 he was named in the World ODI XI by the International Cricket Council and was named in the team of the tournament for the 2015 Cricket World Cup.

Vettori took 20 five-wicket hauls in Test matches, including taking ten wickets in a match three times. His best innings figures were achieved in Auckland in 1999–2000 against Australia where he took 7/87; he finished with career best-match figures of 12/149, the second best by a New Zealander at the time. As of August 2022 these match figures remain the third-best ever by a New Zealander, with only Ajaz Patel and Richard Hadlee having taken better figures in a match. He also took 12 wickets against Bangladesh 2004 and 10 against Sri Lanka in 2006. He took two five-wicket hauls in One Day International matches.

Batting

Vettori developed into a useful lower-order batsman, scoring more than 4,500 Test runs, including six centuries. Although it took him 47 Tests to score his first 1,000 runs at an average of 17.24, the second thousand took just 22 Tests at an average of 42.52 per innings. His highest Test score of 140 came against Sri Lanka at Singhalese Sports Club Cricket Ground, Colombo in August 2009.

Coaching career
Vettori was head coach of Royal Challengers Bangalore in the Indian Premier League from 2014 to 2018. In July 2019, Vettori was appointed as the head coach of the Dublin Chiefs in the first season of the Euro T20 Slam cricket tournament; the tournament was later cancelled. The same month, he became the spin bowling coach for the Bangladesh national side. In August 2021 Vettori was appointed as the head coach of the Caribbean Premier League franchise Barbados Royals.
Vettori works as the assistant and the spin bowling coach for Australia.

Personal life
Vettori is of Italian origin. He married Mary O'Carroll in 2007; the couple have three children. He moved from Hamilton to Auckland after his marriage but continued to play for Northern Districts throughout his career. Vettori was made an Officer of the New Zealand Order of Merit in the 2011 Queen's Birthday Honours, for services to cricket. Vettori is the first cousin of David Hill, a rugby union player who played in one Test for the All Blacks.

A biography of Vettori entitled Turning Point was published in August 2008.

Notes

References

External links

 
 Daniel Vettori BLACKCAPS profile

1979 births
Living people
New Zealand One Day International captains
New Zealand Twenty20 International cricketers
New Zealand people of Italian descent
Northern Districts cricketers
Nottinghamshire cricketers
Warwickshire cricketers
World XI Test cricketers
ICC World XI One Day International cricketers
Cricketers at the 1998 Commonwealth Games
Cricketers at the 1999 Cricket World Cup
Cricketers at the 2003 Cricket World Cup
Cricketers at the 2007 Cricket World Cup
Cricketers at the 2011 Cricket World Cup
Cricketers at the 2015 Cricket World Cup
Delhi Capitals cricketers
Royal Challengers Bangalore cricketers
Commonwealth Games bronze medallists for New Zealand
New Zealand national cricket team selectors
Officers of the New Zealand Order of Merit
Cricketers from Auckland
Cricketers from Hamilton, New Zealand
Brisbane Heat cricketers
Indian Premier League coaches
New Zealand Test cricket captains
Big Bash League coaches
New Zealand cricket coaches
Jamaica Tallawahs cricketers
Commonwealth Games medallists in cricket
People educated at St Paul's Collegiate School
Queensland cricketers
North Island cricketers
Expatriate sportspeople in England
Expatriate sportspeople in Australia
Medallists at the 1998 Commonwealth Games